Aturus is a genus of mites belonging to the family Aturidae.

The species of this genus are found in Europe, Japan, Southern Africa and Northern America.

Species:
 Aturus acadiensis Habeeb, 1953 
 Aturus amnigenus Mitchell, 1954

References

Trombidiformes
Trombidiformes genera